Man Man is an American experimental rock band from Philadelphia currently based in Los Angeles. Their multi-instrumental style is centered on the piano playing of lead singer, songwriter, and lyricist Honus (Ryan Kattner). Honus is accompanied by a group of multi-instrumentalist musicians and vocalists. Instruments played by the band include clavinet, Moog Little Phatty, sousaphone, saxophone, trumpet, French horn, flute, bass clarinet, drum set, euphonium, Fender Jazz Bass, Danelectro baritone guitar, xylophone, marimba, melodica and various percussive instruments including pots and pans, toy noisemakers, Chinese funeral horns, spoons, smashing plates, and fireworks.

History
Man Man released their debut The Man in a Blue Turban with a Face in October 2004 on Ace Fu Records, but did not begin to tour extensively until the 2006 release of their second album Six Demon Bag. In 2007, the band opened for Modest Mouse on several U.S. tours, gaining them further public attention. Not long afterward, Nike began airing a series of commercials starring Rainn Wilson with Man Man's "10 lb Mustache" as the background music. "10 lb Mustache", "Feathers", and "Engrish Bwudd" were featured in season 3, episode 8 of the TV show Weeds. The band also recorded a cover of "Little Boxes" for the title sequence of that episode.

Man Man released their third studio album Rabbit Habits on ANTI- in 2008, and embarked on a North American tour in March 2008, with Yeasayer and Tim Fite splitting dates. They performed at numerous festivals including Voodoo Experience, Coachella Valley Music and Arts Festival, All Tomorrow's Parties, Primavera Sound, and the Meredith Music Festival that same year.

Man Man released their fourth album Life Fantastic in May 2011 with producer Mike Mogis (of Bright Eyes and Monsters of Folk fame). The album featured a less "wacky" and more somber sound than previous releases. The first song written for the album "Steak Knives" was inspired by a failed relationship and the death of several close friends. It took Kattner (Honus Honus) over a year to write.

In 2011 and 2017, Honus released albums with the indie supergroup Mister Heavenly.

Man Man's fifth studio album, On Oni Pond was released on September 10, 2013. The album was again produced by Mike Mogis. The first single, "Head On", peaked at #32 on the Billboard Alternative Songs chart.

In 2015, Honus completed both a solo album and an album of children's music. On November 4, 2016, Honus released his solo album, Use Your Delusion.

On August 9, 2019, the band released a two-song single for Sub Pop Records Singles Series titled "Beached" / "Witch". Six months later in February, 2020, the band announced the release of their first studio album in seven years, Dream Hunting in the Valley of the In-Between. In 2020, they were featured in the game Cyberpunk 2077 with a previously unreleased song "So It Goes", credited in-universe as "Fingers and the Outlaws".

Members

Honus Honus: vocals, piano, electric piano, organ, guitar, ukulele, percussion
Jazz Diesel: trap kit, percussion
Mature Kevin: marimba, bass, melodica, trumpet, clarinet, bass clarinet, percussion, backing vocals
Eggs Foster: bass, guitar, keys, organ, percussion, backing vocals, pack master, Torquoise bass
Topanga Sam: guitar, rice cooker, full-bearded vocals, Furred harp

Past members
Previous members have included, but were not limited to, Tiberius Lyn, Pow Pow (Christopher Powell), Sweet Chestnut (Dan Scofield), Brown Sugar (Adam Schatz), Shono (Bryan Murphy), Kritter Krat/Cougar/Alejandro Borg (Russell Higbee), Turkey Moth/Giamebee (Jamey Robinson), Chang Wang (Billy Blaise Dufala), Blanco (Steven Dufala), Brett Swett, Les Mizzle (Craig Van Hise), G. Clinton Killingsworth (Sam Henderson), Liz Rywelki, King Cyrus King, Dicky Betts Jr. (Matt Gibson), Moonbeam (Evander Green), Thu Butler, Jefferson, Brown Sugar Jr. (Michael Kammers), Pee Wee Tay Tay, Shit Foot (Stephanie Smith), Sara Yurman, and Sergei Sogay (Chris Shar).

Discography

Studio albums
The Man in a Blue Turban with a Face (2004)
Six Demon Bag (2006)
Rabbit Habits (2008)
Life Fantastic (2011)
On Oni Pond (2013)
Dream Hunting in the Valley of the In-Between (2020)

Extended plays
Man Man EP (2004)
Little Torments 7" (2008)
Dig Deep (2022)

Singles
"Head On (Hold On To Your Heart)" - No. 32 Alternative Songs
"Beached" / "Witch"

References

External links
 Official Site
 
 Interview with Honus Honus, Ryan Kattner, The Inflatable Ferret 10/13/11
 Interview with RadioUTD
 Interview with Tiny Mix Tapes' Chris Ruen
 Interview with Pitchfork Media 05/22/06
 WHYME Podcast #49: Interview with Honus Honus of Man Man
 NPR Broadcast of the June 30, 2006 concert in Washington, DC
 Tiny Mix Tapes article on current tour.
 Set of 6 live videos at scheduletwo.com
 Honus Honus interview with Ted Coe on KCSB-FM's The Freak Power Ticket 08/30/10
 

Rock music groups from Pennsylvania
Musical groups from Philadelphia
Musical groups established in 2003
American experimental rock groups
Anti- (record label) artists